Maldives–Nepal relations refers to foreign relations between the Maldives and Nepal. 

Maldives–Nepal relations were officially established on 1 August 1980.

References 

 
Maldives
Nepal